Gretchen Franklin (7 July 1911 – 11 July 2005) was an English actress and dancer with a career in show business spanning over 70 years. She was born in Covent Garden, Central London. She played Ethel Skinner in the long-running BBC 1 soap opera EastEnders on a regular basis from 1985 until 1988. After this she returned to the show intermittently. These appearances became briefer and more widely spaced. Her final appearance was in 2000, when her character was killed off.

Early life 
Gretchen Franklin was born into a theatrical family, the only child of her parents Gordon and Violet Franklin. Her father had a song-and-dance act, while her grandfather was a well-known music-hall entertainer at the turn of the 20th century. Her younger cousin was the comedian Clive Dunn (1920-2012).

She entered show business as a teenager, making her début as a pantomime chorus girl in Bournemouth. In 1929, she took dancing lessons at the Theatre Girls Club in Soho in London's West End and she later became a tap dancer and founder member of a quartet known as Four Brilliant Blondes. Franklin was a Tiller Girl, known for their high kicks, at the London Palladium.

She toured in variety with the comedians Syd and Max Harrison and on the Gracie Fields Show, and performed with another dance group, The Three Girlies, before making a gradual switch to straight dramatic roles.

Acting career 
Her break came during the Second World War when she was cast in Sweet and Low, the first of a series of highly successful West End revues. Staged at the New Ambassadors Theatre, the revues starred Hermione Gingold. Franklin and Gingold became close friends and were reunited in another revue, Slings & Arrows (Comedy Theatre, 1948).

She also appeared in several plays and made one of her early screen appearances in Before I Wake (1955). Her other films included Cloak Without Dagger (1956), Flame in the Streets (1961), The Murder Game (1965), Twisted Nerve (1968),  The Night Visitor (1971), The Three Musketeers (1973), Quincy's Quest (1979), and Ragtime (1981), among others.

Franklin appeared in several productions for the BBC and on stage. One of Franklin's best known stage roles was playing Mrs Roper in the 1958 play Verdict by British mystery writer Agatha Christie. It was produced by Peter Saunders and directed by Charles Hickman, and ran for 250 performances.

Franklin was acting on stage in the West End in Spring and Port Wine in 1965 when she was cast as the first Mrs Alf Garnett in a pilot episode of Till Death Us Do Part, with Warren Mitchell. However, she missed the chance to become a permanent part in what was to become a successful series – because she couldn't obtain her release from her stage role (unable to take a regular role in the series, it was Franklin who recommended her friend Dandy Nichols for the part in the series). Franklin and Nichols have cameo parts in two films directed by Richard Lester, the Beatles film Help! (1965) and How I Won the War (1967) which stars John Lennon.

Later Franklin had regular roles in several television series, including Crossroads, in which she played Myrtle Cavendish (later Harvey); the short-lived soap Castle Haven; the sitcom George and Mildred as Mildred's mother, Mrs Tremble, and Rising Damp as Rigsby's Aunt Maud. She was also a regular supporting figure on television dramas such as Dixon of Dock Green and Z-Cars. She appeared with Eartha Kitt in an episode of the British espionage series The Protectors ("A Pocket Full of Posies", 1974) performing a song and dance routine. She had bit parts in series such as Danger Man, Follyfoot and the final Quatermass serial in 1979.

Franklin also played the troubled mother Mrs Janes in an episode of the television adaptation of Enid Blyton's Famous Five ("Five on Billycock Hill", 1978) and played the witch Cordelia at the end of the first episode of The Black Adder ("The Foretelling", 1983) starring Rowan Atkinson.

Franklin appeared in an early episode of Keeping Up Appearances broadcast in 1990.

EastEnders
EastEnders creators Julia Smith and Tony Holland spent a long time trawling around pubs and street markets in the East End of London, soaking up the atmosphere and making mental notes for when they were to actually create the characters for their show. Smith was very taken with an elderly lady clutching a Yorkshire Terrier dog in one hand and a glass of Guinness in the other, who was clearly the life and soul of the party; Smith saw that there was much comic mileage to be gained from such a character, and as a result Ethel May Skinner was created. In the programme, Ethel was a gossip who did not always get her facts right and this was often used to comic effect, as was her use of malapropisms. However, when Julia Smith announced that the character of Ethel was to go into an old people's home, Franklin resigned, saying "I didn't want Ethel becoming a sad old dear who the others visited occasionally." She did make return visits to the series, but remained bitter at how her character had been sidelined.

Ethel owned a dog, a pug named Willy. The writers had intended it to be a Yorkshire terrier but a suitable canine could not be found. Franklin was less than pleased to find out that Willy the pug was being chauffeur-driven to the BBC's Elstree Studios where EastEnders is made, yet she had to travel by bus. Returning to her earlier skills as a Tiller Girl, when Pat Wicks (Pam St Clement) married Frank Butcher (Mike Reid), Franklin provided the high-kicks at the wedding reception – even though she was 78 at the time.

Her character departed in 1997 when it was revealed that she had left Walford to live in a retirement village. Franklin returned in July 2000, when her character re-appeared in the show and informed her close friends that she was terminally ill with cancer. She was killed off in the episode which aired on 7 September 2000, in a controversial euthanasia storyline. Ethel had learned that she was terminally ill, and asked Dot Cotton (June Brown) to assist her in taking her own life by an overdose of her morphine tablets.

Franklin's departure from EastEnders marked the end of her acting career at the age of 89.

In other media
Franklin's name was mentioned in the lyrics of the song "Telephone Thing" by The Fall. According to lead singer Mark E. Smith, he thought he had "made up the name", and had not heard of Franklin before.

Personal life and death
Franklin was married to writer John Caswell Garth, who was also business manager of the Wilson Barrett acting company and himself an occasional actor, from 1934 until his death from cancer in 1953 at the age of 50. Franklin, who was 42 at the time, never remarried. They had no children.

Off-screen, Franklin devoted much of her later life to charity and gave away all the royalties she received from EastEnders repeats to her favourite animal charities. "At my age one isn't buying new fur coats and diamonds", she said. "If you get that lot of repeat fees four times a year you can afford to be a bit more generous to other people."

In May 2005 at 93 years old, it was announced that Franklin would present the Lifetime Soap Achievement Award to former colleague June Brown at  The British Soap Awards; however, she was too ill to attend. It was instead presented to Brown by another EastEnders actress Anna Wing, who played Lou Beale. Wing mentioned Franklin in her speech.

Franklin died at her home in Barnes on 11 July 2005, four days after her 94th birthday. Her life and work were honoured at the BAFTA Television Awards in 2006.

References

External links

Ethel's death, in a retrospective from bbc.co.uk
Biography – Rigsby Online

1911 births
2005 deaths
Actresses from London
English female dancers
English soap opera actresses
English stage actresses
English television actresses
People from Covent Garden